Brandon Zibaka (born 20 May 1995) is an English footballer playing as a striker for Chorley in  the Conference North.

Career
Zibaka was born in Camden, but he grew up in Collyhurst, Manchester. He started his career in the youth team of Preston North End and was offered a scholarship in 2011. He made his debut for the first team on 13 September 2011, in the League Cup second round tie against Charlton Athletic, in a 2–0 win. He replaced Adam Barton as a substitute in the second half. He became North End's youngest ever player at the age of 16 years and 161 days, beating Doyle Middleton's previous record by 6 days set in 2010. Zibaka signed for Chorley in October 2013.

References

External links

1995 births
Living people
English footballers
Association football forwards
Preston North End F.C. players
Chorley F.C. players